P.H.U.Q. is the second full length album by British Rock band The Wildhearts, which was released on 22 May 1995 on East West Records and entered the UK Albums Chart at number 6.

Original guitarist/singer CJ was only present for some of the early recording sessions for this album and was later fired by group leader Ginger. Subsequently, some of the album's songs were recorded with only one guitar.

It was the band's original vision to follow up Earth vs the Wildhearts with a double album, to include longer, more intricate songs such as "Inglorious" and "Do The Channel Bop." However, lack of support from their record label, EastWest, meant that six songs written by that point were instead released as a fan club-only mini-album, Fishing for Luckies, prior to the release of P.H.U.Q.

Ginger has said the title of the album is pronounced "fuck" in the Ask Ginger section of the band's official website.

In 2015, The Wildhearts toured the UK and Tokyo, playing the album in its entirety for its 20th anniversary. These shows were recorded and released the following year as a live album entitled Never Outdrunk, Never Outsung - PHUQ Live.

In 2022, it was announced that a remastered version of the album would be released on Round Records, restoring the tracks from the original Fishing for Luckies release, to form a double album with the originally intended tracklist.

Track listing 
All songs written by Ginger.

Release information
UK Chart: No. 6

Personnel 
 Ginger - vocals, guitar
 Danny McCormack - bass, vocals
 Ritch Battersby - drums, vocals
 CJ - guitar, vocals (on some tracks)
 Willie Dowling - keyboards

References

The Wildhearts albums
1995 albums
East West Records albums